Felicity Ann Dawn Aston  (born 7 October 1977) is a British explorer, author and former climate scientist.

Early life and career 
Originally from Birchington-on-Sea, Kent, Aston went to Tonbridge Grammar School for Girls and was educated at University College London (BSc) and Reading University (MSc in applied meteorology).

Between 2000 and 2003, Felicity Aston was the senior meteorologist at Rothera Research Station located on Adelaide Island off the Antarctic Peninsula operated by the British Antarctic Survey, monitoring climate and ozone. As was usual at the time for British Antarctic Survey staff, she spent three summers and two winters continuously at the station without leaving the Antarctic.

Exploration and racing 

In 2005, she joined a race across Arctic Canada to the 1996 position of the North Magnetic Pole, known as the Polar Challenge. She was part of the first all-female team to complete this race; they came in 6th place out of 16 teams.

In 2006, Aston was part of the first all-female British expedition across the Greenland ice sheet.

In 2009, she was the team leader of the Kaspersky Commonwealth Antarctic Expedition, which was a Commonwealth of Nations expedition in which seven women from six Commonwealth member countries skied to the South Pole in 2009 to celebrate the 60th anniversary of the founding of the Commonwealth. Call of the White: Taking the world to the South Pole is her account of this expedition. It was published by Summersdale in 2011 and was a finalist in the Banff Mountain Book Competition in that year.

In 2012, she became the first person to ski alone across the Antarctic land-mass using only personal muscle power, as well as the first woman to cross the Antarctic land-mass alone. Her journey began on 25 November 2011, at the Leverett Glacier and continued for 59 days and a distance of 1,084 miles (1,744 kilometres). She had two supply drops. She said, 'The fact that I had crossed Antartica. despite the tears and the fear and the alone-ness, deepened my belief that we are each far more capable than we give ourselves credit for. Our bodies are stronger and our minds more resilient than we could ever imagine.'

In 2018 she led the an all-women EuroArabian expedition to the North Pole, which included the mountaineer Asma Al Thani, who became the first Qatari person to ski there. 

Aston has also walked across the ice of Lake Baikal, the world's deepest and oldest lake, and completed the Marathon des Sables. , she has started preparing for a B.I.G (Before It's Gone) North Pole 2022 expedition, with five other women, to research Arctic sea ice.

Positions and awards 
She is an official ambassador for both the British Antarctic Monument Trust and the Equaladventure charity, and was awarded an honorary doctorate by Canterbury Christ Church University for her exploration achievements.  She is a Fellow of the Royal Geographical Society and The Explorers Club. In 2016 she co-presented a television history programme series about the 1898 Klondyke Gold Rush. Her photo-portrait by Anita Corbin was one of the 100 First Women Portraits at the Royal Albert Memorial Museum & Art Gallery, Exeter.  

Aston was appointed Member of the Order of the British Empire (MBE), and awarded the Polar Medal in the 2015 New Year Honours for services to polar exploration.

Personal life 
She lives in Iceland and farms eider ducks on an island in the Arctic Westfjords, is married and has a son.

References 

Living people
1977 births
English women scientists
English explorers
British climatologists
Women climatologists
British expatriates in Iceland
British Antarctic Survey
Fellows of the Royal Geographical Society
Members of the Order of the British Empire
Female recipients of the Polar Medal
Female polar explorers
Explorers of Antarctica
British Antarctic scientists
Women earth scientists
Women Antarctic scientists
People from Birchington-on-Sea
Alumni of University College London
Alumni of the University of Reading